Holy Cross ( in Deg Xinag) is a city in Yukon-Koyukuk Census Area, Alaska, United States. At the 2010 census the population was 178, down from 227 in 2000.

Geography
Holy Cross is located at  (62.198048, -159.773418).

Demographics

Holy Cross first appeared on the 1880 U.S. Census as the unincorporated Inuit village of "Askhomute." In 1890, it was reported as "Kozerevsky." In 1900 and 1910, it was called "Koserefsky." It did not report on the 1920 U.S. Census. In 1930, it was then returned as Holy Cross for the first time. It was formally incorporated in 1968.

As of the census of 2000, there were 227 people, 64 households, and 49 families residing in the city.  The population density was 7.3 people per square mile (2.8/km2).  There were 81 housing units at an average density of 2.6 per square mile (1.0/km2).  The racial makeup of the city was 3.52% White and 96.48% Native American.

Of the 64 households, 43.8% had children under the age of 18 living with them, 46.9% were married couples living together, 15.6% had a female householder with no husband present, and 23.4% were non-families. 17.2% of all households were made up of individuals, and 3.1% had someone living alone who was 65 years of age or older.  The average household size was 3.55 and the average family size was 4.00.

In the city, the age distribution of the population shows 38.8% under the age of 18, 7.9% from 18 to 24, 28.6% from 25 to 44, 17.2% from 45 to 64, and 7.5% who were 65 years of age or older.  The median age was 27 years. For every 100 females, there were 136.5 males.  For every 100 females age 18 and over, there were 127.9 males.

The median income for a household in the city was $21,875, and the median income for a family was $26,250. Males had a median income of $37,813 versus $16,250 for females. The per capita income for the city was $8,542.  About 33.3% of families and 45.6% of the population were below the poverty line, including 45.2% of those under the age of eighteen and 47.1% of those 65 or over.

Education
The Iditarod Area School District operates the Holy Cross School in Grayling.

References

Cities in Alaska
Cities in Yukon–Koyukuk Census Area, Alaska
Deg Xitʼan
Yukon River